Le Peletier is a station on Line 7 of the Paris Métro. Located in the 9th arrondissement, it was opened in 1910. It is named in reference to Rue le Peletier, which was named after Louis Peletier, who was the last but one Prévôt des marchands de Paris (provost of the merchants of Paris) between 1784 and 1789. This feudal position was abolished in the French Revolution.

The Opéra National de Paris was located in the Salle Peletier, on Rue le Peletier, between 1821 and 1873, when it was destroyed by fire. It was the first theatre to use gas lighting to illuminate the stage. The station is located a short walk from Notre-Dame-de-Lorette station on Line 12, but no free transfer is permitted.

Station layout

Gallery

References
Roland, Gérard (2003). Stations de métro. D’Abbesses à Wagram. Éditions Bonneton.

Paris Métro stations in the 9th arrondissement of Paris
Railway stations in France opened in 1910